Ayesha Zafar (born 9 September 1994) is a Pakistani cricketer who plays as a right-handed batter for Pakistan. She has also played domestic cricket for Karachi, Sindh, Saif Sports Saga and State Bank of Pakistan.

In October 2018, she was named in Pakistan's squad for the 2018 ICC Women's World Twenty20 tournament in the West Indies. In October 2021, she was named in Pakistan's team for the 2021 Women's Cricket World Cup Qualifier tournament in Zimbabwe.

References

External links
 
 

1994 births
Living people
Cricketers from Sialkot
Pakistani women cricketers
Pakistan women One Day International cricketers
Pakistan women Twenty20 International cricketers
Karachi women cricketers
Sindh women cricketers
Saif Sports Saga women cricketers
State Bank of Pakistan women cricketers